Adiabatic accessibility denotes a certain relation between two equilibrium states of a thermodynamic system (or of different such systems). The concept was coined by Constantin Carathéodory in 1909 ("adiabatische Erreichbarkeit") and  taken up 90 years later by Elliott Lieb and J. Yngvason in their axiomatic approach to the foundations of thermodynamics. It was also used by R. Giles in his 1964 monograph.

Description
A system in a state Y is said to be adiabatically accessible from a state X if X can be transformed into Y without the system suffering transfer of energy as heat or transfer of matter. X may, however, be transformed to Y by  doing work on X. For example, a system consisting of one kilogram of warm water is adiabatically accessible from a system consisting of one kilogram of cool water, since the cool water may be mechanically stirred to warm it. However, the cool water is not adiabatically accessible from the warm water, since no amount or type of work may be done to cool it.

Carathéodory
The original definition of Carathéodory was limited to reversible, quasistatic process, described by a curve in the manifold of equilibrium states of the system under consideration. He called such a state change adiabatic if the infinitesimal 'heat' differential form  
vanishes along the curve.  In other words, at no time in the process does heat enter or leave the system. Carathéodory's formulation of the Second Law of Thermodynamics then takes the form: "In the neighbourhood of any initial state, there are states which cannot be approached arbitrarily close through adiabatic changes of state." From this principle he derived the existence of entropy as a state function 
whose differential  is proportional to the heat differential form  , so it remains constant under adiabatic state changes (in Carathéodory's sense). The increase of entropy during irreversible 
processes is not obvious in this formulation, without further assumptions.

Lieb and Yngvason
The definition employed by Lieb and Yngvason is rather different since the state changes considered can be the result of arbitrarily complicated, possibly violent, irreversible processes and there is no mention of 'heat' or differential forms. In the example of the water given above, if the stirring is done slowly, the transition from cool water to warm water will be quasistatic. However, a system containing an exploded firecracker is adiabatically accessible from a system containing an unexploded firecracker (but not vice versa), and this transition is far from quasistatic. Lieb and Yngvason's definition of adiabatic accessibility is: A state  is  adiabatically accessible from a state , in symbols  (pronounced X 'precedes' Y),  if it is possible to transform  into  in such a way that the only net effect of the process on the surroundings is that a weight has been raised or lowered (or a spring is stretched/compressed, or a flywheel is set in motion).

Thermodynamic entropy
A definition of thermodynamic entropy can be based entirely on certain properties of the relation  of adiabatic accessibility that are taken as axioms in the Lieb-Yngvason approach. In the following list of properties of the  operator, a system is represented by a capital letter, e.g. (e.g. for a simple gas, this would mean twice the amount of gas in twice the volume, at the same pressure.) A system consisting of two subsystems X and Y is written (X,Y). This is an equivalence relationship written . Otherwise, it is irreversible. Adiabatic accessibility has the following properties:

Reflexivity: 
Transitivity: If  and  then 
Consistency: if  and  then 
Scaling Invariance: if  and  then 
Splitting and Recombination:  for all 
Stability: if  then 

The entropy has the property that  if and only if  and  if and only if  in accord with the Second Law. If we choose two states  and  such that  and assign entropies 0 and 1 respectively to them, then the entropy of a state X where  is defined as:

Sources

References

 translated from  André Thess: Das Entropieprinzip - Thermodynamik für Unzufriedene, Oldenbourg-Verlag 2007, . A less mathematically intensive and more intuitive  account of the theory of Lieb and Yngvason.

External links
 A. Thess: Was ist Entropie? 

Equilibrium chemistry
Thermodynamic cycles
Thermodynamic processes
Thermodynamic systems
Thermodynamics